The dietary energy supply is the food available for human consumption, usually expressed in kilocalories or kilojoules per person per day.  It gives an overestimate of the total amount of food consumed as it reflects both food consumed and food wasted.  It varies markedly between different regions and countries of the world. It has also changed significantly over the 21st century.  Dietary energy supply is correlated with the rate of obesity.

Regions

Daily dietary energy supply per capita:

Countries

See also
Diet and obesity

References

External links

Obesity
Diets